James Tucker Airport  (also known as James Tucker Perry County Airport) is a county-owned, public-use airport located three nautical miles (6 km) southwest of the central business district of Linden, a town in Perry County, Tennessee, United States. The airport is located on the Atlanta and Memphis sectional charts. Opened in October, 1962, the airport was originally known as Perry County Airport prior to being renamed in honor of a local citizen in 2016.

Facilities and aircraft 
It has one runway designated 18/36 with a  asphalt surface. For the 12-month period ending December 31, 2017, the airport had 2,195 aircraft operations, an average of 42 per week: 78% general aviation and 22% military.

The airport is unattended and does not have fuel services. It is included under the Jackson FSS. Although it has pilot controlled runway lighting and PAPI on both runways, the systems have been are listed as indefinitely out of service, leaving the airport open during daylight hours only. NOTAMs are filed with McKellar-Sipes Regional Airport.

See also 
 List of airports in Tennessee

References

External links 

Airports in Tennessee
Buildings and structures in Perry County, Tennessee
Transportation in Perry County, Tennessee